Souilem Gnaoui (January 13, 1914 – November 5, 2008) nicknamed La Perle Noire (The black Pearl) was an Algerian footballer who spent most of his career with USM Oran and also the in French championship.

Honours

Clubs
USM Oran
 Oran League: 1933
 North African Championship: runner-up 1933, 1935

Red Star Olympique
 Ligue 2: 1938–39

References

1914 births
2008 deaths
Association football midfielders
Algerian footballers
Footballers from Oran
Ligue 1 players
USM Oran players
Olympique de Marseille players
OGC Nice players
Red Star F.C. players
MC Oran managers
Algerian football managers
SC Fives players
21st-century Algerian people